Our Blues is a 2022 South Korean television series starring Lee Byung-hun, Shin Min-a, Cha Seung-won, Lee Jung-eun, Uhm Jung-hwa, Han Ji-min, and Kim Woo-bin. The series revolves around the sweet and bitter lives of people at the end, climax, or beginning of life, and depicts their stories in an omnibus format against the backdrop of Jeju Island. It  premiered on tvN on April 9, 2022, and  aired every Saturday and Sunday at 21:10 (KST) with 20 episodes. It is available for streaming on Netflix in selected regions. It is also one of the highest-rated dramas in Korean cable television history.

Cast

Main 
 Lee Byung-hun as Lee Dong-seok, a truck merchant who was born in Jeju.
 Ryu Hae-jun as young Lee Dong-seok
 Shin Min-a as Min Seon-ah, a single parent with a child who came to Jeju and works with Lee Dong-seok.
 Kim Ah-song as young Min Seon-ah
 Lee Jung-eun as Jeong Eun-hee, the owner of a fish store who has a bubbly charm.
 Shim Dal-gi as young Jeong Eun-hee
 Cha Seung-won as Choi Han-soo, who returns to his hometown of Jeju as a perfect urban man and Jeong Eun-hee's first love.
 Kim Jae-won as young Choi Han-soo
 Uhm Jung-hwa as Go Mi-ran, Eun-hee's best friend from her high school days and her benefactor.
 Yeon Shi-woo as young Go Mi-ran
 Han Ji-min as Lee Young-ok, a first-year haenyeo.
 Hong Jung-min as young Lee Young-ok
 Kim Woo-bin as Park Jeong-joon, a captain with a clear and warm nature.

Supporting 
 Kim Hye-ja as Kang Ok-dong, Lee Dong-seok's mother.
 Go Doo-shim as Hyeon Chun-hee, a mercantile woman who has worked for over 60 years. All but one of her children died before reaching adulthood.
 Bae Hyun-sung as Jung Hyun, a 18-year-old high school student born in Jeju.
 Roh Yoon-seo as Bang Young-joo, a high school student born in Jeju who wants to escape to Seoul. She became pregnant with Hyun's child.
 Ahn Tae-rin as young Bang Young-joo
 Park Ji-hwan as Jung In-kwon, who owns a food stall at a fish market in Jeju Island and Jung Hyun's father. 
 Park Sang-won as young Jung In-kwon
 Choi Young-joon as Bang Ho-sik, an ice maker who sells ice at a fish market in Jeju Island and Bang Young-joo's father. 
 Kang Yi-seok as young Bang Ho-sik
 Ki So-yu as Son Eun-gi, Hyun Chun-hee's 6 year old granddaughter.

Others 
 Kim Kwang-kyu as Kim Myung-bo, SS Bank branch manager Jeju Pureung, classmate with Han-soo.
 Cho Hye-jung as Dal-i, Young-ok's friend.
 Jung Sung-il as Kim Tae-hoon, Min Seon-ah's sensitive and tired husband.
 Chun Dong-bin as classmate of Bang Young-joo and Jung Hyun
 Park Ji-ah as Hye-ja, haenyeo from Jeju.
 Jung Eun-hye as Lee Young-hui, Young-ok's elder twin sister who has Down syndrome.
Jin Hyo-jung as young Lee Young-hui
Lee So-byul as Byul, a woman who operates a coffee truck in the market. She is the sister of Dal-i, and since she is deaf, she communicates in sign language.
 Baek Seung-do as Park Ki-joon, Jung-jun's younger brother.
 Kim Jung-hwan as Son Man-su, the sole surviving son of Hyun Chun-hee, Eun-gi's father.
 Min Ji-ah as Oh Hae-sun, Man-su's wife and Eun-gi's mother. After Man-su's accident, she had no choice but to give Eun-gi to Chun-hee to earn money while taking care of Man-su at the hospital.
 Yang Hee-kyung as Ms. Jang, the operator of the orphanage where the two sisters Young-hui and Young-ok lived since childhood.
 Choi Byung-mo as Jong-woo, Dong-seok's stepfather's son.
 Choi Seung-kyung as Jong-cheol, Dong-seok's stepfather's son.
 Yoon Byung-hee as Bae Jeong-muk, a captain who came to Pureung Village from abroad.
 Kim Ha-eon as Kim Yeol, son of Seon-ah and Tae-hoon.
 Kim Young-min as Mi-ran's second ex-husband.
 Park Soon-chun as A wide-eyed, loose-minded aunty who runs a small market in Purung Village.
 Jo Ara as In-jeong, Myung-bo's wife suffers from dysphoria.
 Park Hye-na as Min-jin, Han-soo's wife.
 Hyun Bong-sik as bank customer
 Han Ji-hyun as Hyun Young-joo
 Park Jeong-eon as school teacher
 Kim Gun-ho as Innkeeper

Special appearance 
 Park Sung-yeon as investigator on Seon Ah and Tae-hoon's divorce situation

Production

Development 
The series written by Noh Hee-kyung is her comeback after the 2018 drama Live. Our Blues, is a 20-episode drama written by Noh Hee-kyung, directed by Kim Gyu-tae and co-produced by Studio Dragon.

The show will be divided into episodes which will be parts of each character.

Casting 
On April 20, 2021, it was reported that Shin Min-a and Kim Woo-bin were offered roles in the series and they were considering it positively. The cast lineup was confirmed on October 10, 2021. The drama represents Kim Woo-bin's return to television after a hiatus of 6 years, with his last TV series being Uncontrollably Fond in 2016.

Filming 
Filming began in Jeju Island in October 2021 after finalizing complete cast. In an interview to Cine21 the director of the series revealed that the series depicts the lives of ordinary people in the Jeju oil field as the background. It has 14 main characters making 8 stories. 70% of the filming was done in Jeju Island.

On February 9, 2022, it was reported that Lee Byung-hun tested positive for COVID-19 and is currently in self-quarantine. The filming for the series has been stopped since February 7. Later On February 21, 2022, actor Lee Byung-hun has posted a picture that he has recovered from COVID-19 symptoms.

On February 17, 2022, actress Han Ji-min posted a photo on SNS saying that her part had finished filming.

On March 27, 2022, actress Shin Min-a posted a photo on SNS saying that her part had finished filming.

Original soundtrack

Part 1

Part 2

Part 3

Part 4

Part 5

Part 6

Part 7

Part 8

Part 9

Part 10

Chart performance

Viewership

Accolades

Notes

References

External links
  
 
 
 

TVN (South Korean TV channel) television dramas
Television series by Studio Dragon
2022 South Korean television series debuts
2022 South Korean television series endings
Television shows written by Noh Hee-kyung
Korean-language Netflix exclusive international distribution programming